Agalenatea redii is a species of 'orbweavers' belonging to the family Araneidae subfamily Araneinae.

Description
The coloration of the body is very variable. The basic color varies from light or dark brown to yellowish-orange. They usually show a dark longitudinal band in the middle of the abdomen, with some trasversal bands. Sometimes the opisthosoma has two large white spots or one dark brown light-edged spot on the back. Chelicerae and legs are brown. The whole body is densely hairy, especially in the anterior body section (prosoma). The thorax is relatively broad, pear-shaped. The abdomen (opisthosoma) is quite flat and wider than long.

Biology
This species of 'orbweavers' has one generation a year (univoltine). Adults are  thermophilic. They are active very early and can already be encountered from April. Spawning occurs in early summer. Adult males are found until June, while females, still abundant in July, begin to disappear around August. Each female lays from 70 to 130 eggs. The newborns are already sub-adults by the beginning of winter. They overwinter, only to become adults in the next spring.

Distribution and habitat
This species is present in most of Europe, Turkey, Caucasus, Russia (Europe to South Siberia), Iran, Central Asia and China. These 'orbweavers' prefer open habitats, like sandy and arid grasslands, dry shrubs and bushes, sunny edges of woods, warm steppes, etc.

Gallery

Bibliography
Scopoli, J. A. (1763) Entomologia carniolica, exhibens insecta carniolae indigena et distributa in ordines, genera, species, varietates. Methodo Linnaeana., Vindobonae, 420 pp. (Araneae, pp. 392–404).
Buchar J. & Růžička V. (2002): Catalogue of spiders of the Czech Republic. Peres, Praha.
Locket G H, Millidge A F (1953) British spiders. Vol. II. Ray Society, London, 449 pp
Otto S (2020) Caucasian spiders. A faunistic database on the spiders of the Caucasus Ecoregion
Roberts M J (1995) Collins Field Guide: Spiders of Britain & Northern Europe. HarperCollins, London, 383 p
Roberts, M.J., 1985c, Atypidae to Theridiosomatidae, Harley Books,
van Helsdingen, P.J.. 1996, A county distribution of Irish spiders, incorporating a revised catalogue of the species, Irish Naturalists' Journal, 1-92

References

External links
 Biolib
 Fugleonatur

Araneidae
Spiders of Europe
Spiders of Asia
Spiders described in 1763
Palearctic spiders
Taxa named by Giovanni Antonio Scopoli